is a railway station in Suruga-ku, Shizuoka, Shizuoka Prefecture, Japan, operated by the private railway company, Shizuoka Railway (Shizutetsu).

Lines
Pref. Sports Park Station is a station on the Shizuoka–Shimizu Line and is 4.8 kilometers from the starting point of the line at Shin-Shizuoka Station.

Station layout
The station has two island platforms, with 2 tracks for each direction, to allow for the passing of express trains in either direction. The main entrance and station building, located within an office building to the west of the platforms, has automated ticket machines, and automated turnstiles, which accept the LuLuCa smart card ticketing system as well as the PiTaPa and ICOCA IC cards. An underground passageway connects the office building to the platforms. A secondary entrance is also located directly north of the platforms. Neither entrance is wheelchair accessible.

Platforms

Adjacent stations

Station History
The station was reconstructed and renamed in 1991.

Passenger statistics
In fiscal 2017, the station was used by an average of 1793 passengers daily (boarding passengers only).

Surrounding area
Kusanagi Athletic Stadium
Konohana Arena
TV Shizuoka

See also
 List of railway stations in Japan

References

External links

 Shizuoka Railway official website

}

Railway stations in Shizuoka Prefecture
Railway stations in Japan opened in 1908
Railway stations in Shizuoka (city)